Sam Bullough (1909 – January 1973) was a British trade unionist.

Bullough was elected as vice-president of the Yorkshire Area of the National Union of Mineworkers in 1954, and then as its president in 1960.  In 1963, he was also elected as national vice-president of the union.

His unexpected death left the post of president vacant, to be taken by the compensation agent, Arthur Scargill.

References

External links 
photo

1909 births
1973 deaths
Trade unionists from Yorkshire
Vice Presidents of the National Union of Mineworkers (Great Britain)